Saraphi may refer to:
 Saraphi District
 Saraphi Subdistrict
 Saraphi Municipality